Sreedhanya is an Indian actress and television host who works in predominantly Malayalam-language films and television shows.

Career 
Sreedhanya participated in a talk show on Jeevan TV before receiving her first show as an anchor with Samantharam on Amrita TV. She went on to host several shows including Vaidyasala, Veedu, and Grihathuram. She played supporting roles in several films before playing one of the leads in Njan Samvidhanam Cheyyum under the stage name of Gayathri. She worked as a Malayalam tutor for Vidya Balan for the film Aami before Balan left the project. In 2017, she replaced Bhagyalakshmi as a host for "Selfie" on Kairali TV.

Filmography 
All films are in Malayalam, unless otherwise noted..

Television

Endorsements
 Amazon Great Indian Festival
 Vaibhav Jewellers
 Sujatha Mixie
 Kanyaka Magazine
 M4  Marry Official

Awards and nominations

References

External links 

Living people
Indian film actresses
Actresses in Malayalam cinema
Actresses in Malayalam television
Actresses in Telugu television
21st-century Indian actresses
Actresses in Tamil cinema
1983 births